Expo 2030 is a proposed world's fair to be held in 2030. The candidate cites are Busan, Rome, Odesa, and Riyadh.

Candidature process
Russia was the first to submit a bid, with a submission for Moscow on 25 April 2021. This opened a six-month window for other submissions to be made by 29 October. Following five conferences to attract attention for a 2030 bid, South Korea submitted a proposal for Busan on 23 June 2021. Italy was the third country to submit a bid, proposing the city of Rome as host city. Ukraine submitted a bid for Odesa on 15 October. Saudi Arabia submitted a bid for Riyadh on 29 October. The host country of Expo 2030 will be elected in 2023 by BIE member states.

Candidates
On 29 October 2021 BIE confirmed five bids for the Expo 2030:
  Busan, South Korea
  Rome, Italy
  Odesa, Ukraine
  Riyadh, Saudi Arabia
 Russia had proposed a bid for Moscow, but withdrew in May 2022 following its military invasion of Ukraine.

External links
 Bureau International des Expositions (BIE)

Bids
 Busan
 Riyadh
 Rome
 Odesa
 Moscow (offline)

References

2030
World's fairs in Asia
World's fairs in Europe